Thunder in the Valley, sometimes known as Bob, Son of Battle, is a 1947 American Drama Western film directed by Louis King and starring Lon McCallister, Peggy Ann Garner and Edmund Gwenn. It is based on the 1898 novel Owd Bob by Alfred Ollivant.

It cost $1.9 million.

Plot
A story of the Scottish highhands about a crockerty old sheepherder, Adam MacAdam who loves his prize collie dog, but little else, not even his son Davis. But David, with the help of a neighbor's daughter, Maggie Moore, raises his own prize dog and beats out his father in a contest.

Cast
 Lon McCallister - David MacAdam
 Peggy Ann Garner - Maggie Moore
 Edmund Gwenn - Adam MacAdam
 Reginald Owen - James Moore
 Charles Irwin - Long Kirby

Production
Parts of the film were shot in Duck Creek, Strawberry Valley, Strawberry Point, Kanab Canyon, Navajo Lake, and Blue Springs in Utah.

References

External links
 
 
 

1947 films
1947 drama films
American Western (genre) films
1947 Western (genre) films
20th Century Fox films
Films set in England
Films directed by Louis King
American drama films
Films shot in Utah
Films based on British novels
Films scored by Cyril J. Mockridge
1940s English-language films
1940s American films